HMS Daphne was an Amazon-class sloop, of the Royal Navy. She was in service from 1866 to 1879.

History
Daphne was built at the Pembroke Dockyard and launched on 23 October 1866. she spent her entire career east of Suez – in the East Indies and particularly on anti-slavery operations on the East coast of Africa.

She was commissioned at Plymouth on 12 June 1867 by Cdr George Lydiard Sulivan.. In October 1872, Daphne ran aground in the Mergui Archipelago. She was refloated and taken in to Bombay, India for repairs. Daphne came back to finally pay off in 1879.

"Each of her commissions lasted four years, and her ever recurring appearance at so many successive slave running seasons earned a tradition of wrath at the mention of her name among the merchants in that line of business", wrote Admiral Ballard in July 1938.

References

Publications
 

 

 http://www.ajbrown.me.uk/IndividualStories/WGOrchard/HMS_Daphne.htm
 Dhow chasing in Zanzibar waters and on the eastern coast of Africa. Narrative of five years' experiences in the suppression of the slave trade by Sulivan, George Lydiard. Publication date: 1873. Reprint: Cambridge Library Collection, 2011.

 

1866 ships
Amazon-class sloops
Ships built in Pembroke Dock
Victorian-era sloops of the United Kingdom
Maritime incidents in October 1872